Tallisha Harden (born 21 July 1992) is an Australian rugby league footballer who plays for the Brisbane Broncos in the NRL Women's Premiership and Burleigh Bears in the QRL Women's Premiership.

Primarily a er, she is an Australian and Queensland representative.

Playing career

Volleyball

Rugby union
A former Australian indoor volleyball player, Harden began playing rugby union at age 19.  She played for Sunnybank and Queensland before switching full-time to rugby league in 2018.

Rugby league
In 2013, Harden began playing rugby league. In 2014, she represented the Indigenous All Stars. In 2015, 2016 and 2020, she captained the side.

On 3 May 2015, she made her Test debut for Australia, coming off the bench in a 22–14 win over New Zealand at Suncorp Stadium. On 27 June 2015, she made her debut for Queensland in a 4–all draw with New South Wales at 1300SMILES Stadium.

In June 2018, Harden represented South East Queensland at the inaugural Women's National Championships. On 14 June 2018, she joined the Brisbane Broncos NRL Women's Premiership team. In Round 3 of the 2018 NRL Women's season, she made her debut for the Broncos in a 32–10 win over the New Zealand Warriors.

In May 2019, she represented South East Queensland at the Women's National Championships. On 29 June 2019, she signed with the Sydney Roosters NRLW team and was named their Player of the Year at the end of the season.

In October 2019, Harden represented Australia at the 2019 Rugby League World Cup 9s and earned a recall to the Jillaroos Test side after a four-year absence, coming off the bench and scoring a try in a 28–8 win over New Zealand at WIN Stadium.

In September 2020, Harden re-joined the Brisbane Broncos NRLW side.

On 20 February 2021, she captained the Indigenous All Stars in their 24–0 loss to the Māori All Stars.

Achievements and accolades

Individual
Sydney Roosters Player of the Year: 2019

Team
2020 NRLW Grand Final: Brisbane Broncos – Winners

References

External links
Brisbane Broncos profile

1992 births
Living people
Rugby league players from Logan, Queensland
Indigenous Australian rugby league players
Australian female rugby league players
Australia women's national rugby league team players
Rugby league second-rows
Brisbane Broncos (NRLW) players
Sydney Roosters (NRLW) players